Person of the Year is an award given by the Foundation of National Hero Çingiz Mustafayev and the ANS Group of Companies.

Winners 
 2001 – Hacıbala Abutalıbov
 2002 – Heydar Aliyev
 2003 – Heydar Aliyev
 2004 – Toşiyuki Fucivara
 2005 – Mehriban Aliyeva
 2006 – Allahshukur Pashazadeh
 2007 – Ilham Aliyev
 2008 – Tahir Salahov
 2009 – Polad Bülbüloğlu
 2010 – Mubariz Ibrahimov
 2011 – Eldar Gasimov and Nigar Jamal
 2012 – Nobody
 2013 – Ilham Aliyev
 2014 – Nobody
 2015 – Mehriban Aliyeva

References

Awards established in 2001
Person of the Year